Romain Wacziarg (born 1970) is an American economist. He is a professor of economics at the UCLA Anderson School of Management (since 2008) and holds the Hans Hufschmid Chair in Management (since 2015). He is also a research associate at the National Bureau of Economic Research. Before joining UCLA, he was on the faculty at the Stanford Graduate School of Business. His research interests span international economics, political economy, economic growth, and development.

Background and professional life 
Romain Wacziarg grew up in India and France. He holds a bachelor's degree in economics and public policy from Sciences Po. He earned a Ph.D. in economics at Harvard in 1998 under the supervision of Alberto Alesina, Robert Barro and Dale W. Jorgenson. During his Ph.D. he was a consultant for the World Bank where he conducted research on the links between economic growth and trade policy.

In 1998, he joined the faculty of the Stanford Graduate School of Business as an assistant professor in the Political Economy Group, where he received tenure in 2006. In 2002–2003 he was a National Fellow at the Hoover Institution. In 2008, he moved to the UCLA Anderson School of Management where he was appointed professor of economics and later chair of the global economics and management area (2011–2015). In 2015, he was awarded the Hans Hufschmid Chair in Management.

Wacziarg's research covers a variety of topics, including:
 The relationship between trade liberalization and growth;
 The long-run determinants of growth and development;
 The determinants of the first demographic transition;
 The causes of inter-state conflict;
 The effects of democratization on economic growth;
 The pattern of sectoral diversification in relation to economic development;
 The effect of cultural distance between countries on the diffusion of technology and development.

Selected publications 

 Openness, Country Size and Government, with A. Alesina (1998), Journal of Public Economics, 69(3), 305–321.
 Is Europe Going Too Far?, with A. Alesina (1999), Carnegie-Rochester Conference Series on Public Policy, 51(1), 1–42.
 Economic Integration and Political Disintegration, with A. Alesina and E. Spolaore (2000), American Economic Review, 90(5), 1276–1296.
 How Democracy Affects Growth, with J. Tavares (2001).  European Economic Review, 45(8), 1341–1378.
 Measuring the Dynamic Gains From Trade, (2001), The World Bank Economic Review, 15(3), 393–429.
 Stages of Diversification, with J. Imbs (2003), American Economic Review, 93(1), 63–86.
 Fractionalization, with A. Alesina, A. Devleeschauwer, W. Easterly, S. Kurlat (2003), Journal of Economic Growth, 8(2), 155–194.
 Trade Liberalization and Intersectoral Labor Movements, with J. Wallack (2004), Journal of International Economics, 64(2), 411–439.
 Do Democratic Transitions Produce Bad Economic Outcomes?, with D. Rodrik (2005), American Economic Review Papers and Proceedings, 50–55.
 Borders and Growth, with E. Spolaore (2005), Journal of Economic Growth, 10(4), 331–386.
 Small States, Big Pork, with W. R. Hauk, Jr. (2007), Quarterly Journal of Political Science, 2(1), 95–106.
 Death and Development, with P. Lorentzen and J. McMillan (2008), Journal of Economic Growth, 13(2), 81-124.
 Trade Liberalization and Growth: New Evidence, with K. Welch (2008), The World Bank Economic Review, 22(2), 187–231.
 The Diffusion of Development, with E. Spolaore (2009), The Quarterly Journal of Economics, 124(2), 469–529.
 A Monte Carlo Study of Growth Regressions, with W. R. Hauk, Jr. (2009), Journal of Economic Growth, 14(2), 103–147.
 The Political Economy of Linguistic Cleavages, with K. Desmet and I. Ortuño-Ortín (2012), Journal of Development Economics, 97(2), 322–338.
 The First Law of Petropolitics (2012), Economica, 79(316), 641–657.
 How Deep Are the Roots of Economic Development?, with E. Spolaore (2013), Journal of Economic Literature, 51(2), 325–369.
 The Democratic Transition, with F. Murtin (2014), Journal of Economic Growth, 19(2), 141–181.
 War and Relatedness, with E. Spolaore (2016), The Review of Economics and Statistics, 98(5), 925–939.
 Culture, Ethnicity and Diversity, with K. Desmet and I. Ortuño-Ortín (2017), American Economic Review, 107(9), 2479–2513.
 Ancestry and Development: New Evidence, with E. Spolaore (2018), Journal of Applied Econometrics, 33(5), 748–762.
 Change and Persistence in the Age of Modernization: Saint-Germain-d'Anxure 1730-1895, with G. Blanc (2020), Explorations in Economic History, 78, 101352.
 The Cultural Divide, with K. Desmet (2021), The Economic Journal, 131(637), 2058-2088.
 Understanding Spatial Variation in COVID-19 across the United States, with K. Desmet (2022), Journal of Urban Economics, 127, 103332.
 Fertility and Modernity, with E. Spolaore (2022), The Economic Journal, 132(642), 796-833.

References

External links 
 Romain Wacziarg's personal website
 Official UCLA website
 Google Scholar Profile
 VoxEU page

1970 births
Living people
21st-century American economists
UCLA Anderson School of Management faculty
Sciences Po alumni
Harvard Graduate School of Arts and Sciences alumni
Fellows of the European Economic Association